Hodnet railway station was a station in Hodnet, Shropshire, England. The station was opened in 1867 and closed in 1963.

References

Further reading

Disused railway stations in Shropshire
Railway stations in Great Britain opened in 1867
Railway stations in Great Britain closed in 1963
Former Great Western Railway stations